The 1997 Swedish Open was a men's tennis tournament played on outdoor clay courts in Båstad, Sweden that was part of the World Series of the 1997 ATP Tour. It was the 50th edition of the tournament and was held from 7 July until 13 July 1997. Fourth-seeded Magnus Norman won the singles title.

Finals

Singles

 Magnus Norman defeated  Juan Antonio Marín 7–5, 6–2
 It was Norman's first singles title of his career.

Doubles

 Nicklas Kulti /  Mikael Tillström defeated  Magnus Gustafsson /  Magnus Larsson 6–0, 6–3

References

External links
 Official website 
 ATP tournament profile
 ITF tournament edition details

Swedish Open
Swedish Open
Swedish Open
Swedish Open
Swed